Ettore Zappi (1904–1986), aka Anthony Russo, was an Italian-American mobster in the Gambino crime family who rose to the position of capo. 

He died at his home in Hollywood, Florida after a long illness.

References

1904 births
1986 deaths
Gambino crime family
American gangsters of Italian descent